Michael Palmer (born 1960), also known as Palma Dog, is a Jamaican reggae musician who released several albums in the 1980s.

Biography
Born in the Maxfield Park area of Kingston in 1960, Palmer began his career performing with sound systems such as Stereophonic Sound with General Echo in the late 1970s, taking inspiration from the success of his neighbour Leroy Smart. The shooting death of Echo and Stereophonic's owner Big John in 1980 was a blow to Palmer's career. His debut single, "Mr Landlord" (1975), recorded for producer Oswald Thomas was not successful, and it was not until a couple of years later when he found success with "Smoke the Weed", recorded at Channel One, and with producer Jah Thomas on tracks such as "Ghetto Dance" and "Different Love". He went on to work with a variety of producers including George Phang, Sugar Minott, Prince Jammy, and Joseph Hoo Kim, and enjoyed a number one single in Jamaica in 1984 with the Phang-produced "Lick Shot". He also performed at the Reggae Sunsplash festival that year. His recordings led to a series of mid-1980s albums, including split albums with Frankie Jones, Frankie Paul, Johnny Osbourne, and Kelly Ranks.

Palmer moved into production, achieving success with Neville Brown's "Haul and Pull Up", and returned to recording himself in the early 1990s, with singles such as "Juggling" and "Everyone Makes Love". After being advised to give up singing due to vocal problems, Palmer moved to the United States and was out of the music industry for almost 20 years.

Palmer returned to music in the 21st century, performing in the US, and released new music in 2017. Michael Palmer has teamed up with his new manager Barrington Gray, Cedar Valley Records (Sweden) and producer/engineer Andre "Tripple T" Daley (Jamaica) the magician behind some of the Exterminator Label most memorable mixes, a number of new tracks will be released in 2018 by this team.

Discography
Lickshot (1982), Power House
Star Performer (1984), Tonos
Pull It Up Now (1985), Greensleeves
Angella (1984), Vista Sounds
Showdown vol. 4 (1984), Hitbound/Empire – with Frankie Jones
Double Trouble (1985), Greensleeves – with Frankie Paul
Ghetto Living (1985), Bebo's
I'm So Attractive (1985), Jammy's
Sweet Daddy (1985), Black Scorpio
We Rule (1985), Power House
Michael Palmer Meets Kelly Ranks at Channel One (1985), Dancefloor
Wicked (1985), Vibes & Vibes – with Johnny Osbourne
Showcase – I'm Still Dancing (198?), Midnight Rock
Joint Favourites (1986), Greensleeves – with Half Pint
Where Is That Love (2018), Cedar Valley Records

Compilations
Triston Palma Meets Michael Palmer, Midnight Rock – with Triston Palmer

References

1960 births
Living people
Musicians from Kingston, Jamaica
Jamaican reggae musicians
Greensleeves Records artists